The Triennale Game Collection is a series of original   independent video game anthologies, published for free in 2016 and 2022 at the occasions of the 21st and 23rd Triennale di Milano and of the Milano Game Festival.

Concept 
The collection is introduced as "a virtual exhibition of video games" showcasing their "artists’ experimental approach to interactivity". The games are developed specifically for the collection by various creators from around the world. The project is overseen by Pietro Righi Riva and the studio Santa Ragione.

Games

Volume 1 
The five games from the first collection (2016) are the following:

 Il Filo Conduttore, by Mario von Rickenbach and Christian Etter
 LOCK, by Auriea Harvey and Michaël Samyn (Tale of Tales)
 Neighbor, by Jake Elliott, Tamas Kemenczy and Ben Babbitt (Cardboard Computer)
 A Glass Room, by Pol Clarissou
 The Worm Room, by Everest Pipkin

Volume 2 
The five games from the second collection (2022) are the following:

 WADE, by Optillusion
 We Are Poems, by Fern Goldfarb-Ramallo
 Nonno’s Legend, by Nina Freeman (Star Maid Games)
 MINE, by Adkwasi Bediako Afrane
 Contact, by Llaura McGee (Dreamfeel)

Development 
First published from June 16, 2016, with a game each week on Android and iOS, the first volume of the collection was then adapted for Windows and MacOS computers in a version released on December 7, 2016. Two of the games, Il Filo Conduttore and The Worm Room, were later rereleased by their artists as standalone updated versions.

The second volume is launched for the 23rd Triennale, with five games for Android, iOS, Windows and MacOS published between July 12 and September 30, 2022.

Notes and references

See also 

 Triennale di Milano
 Art game

External links 

 Triennale Game Collection
 Page about the collection on the Triennale’s website

Video games developed in Ireland
Video games developed in Ghana
Video games developed in Argentina
Video games developed in China
Video games developed in France
Video games developed in Belgium
Video games developed in Switzerland
Video games developed in the United States
Video games developed in Italy
MacOS games
Windows games
IOS games
Android (operating system) games
Art games
2022 video games
2016 video games
Indie video games
Video game compilations